Eva Ornstová is a Czech slalom canoeist who competed at the international level from 2005 to 2015.

She won a gold medal in the K1 team event at the 2013 ICF Canoe Slalom World Championships in Prague. She also won a bronze medal in the same event at the 2013 European Canoe Slalom Championships in Augsburg.

References

Czech female canoeists
Living people
Year of birth missing (living people)
Medalists at the ICF Canoe Slalom World Championships